Michaluk is the surname of the following people

Art Michaluk (1923-2006), Canadian professional ice hockey defenceman
John Michaluk (1928-1998), Canadian professional ice hockey left winger
John Michaluk (born c. 1942), Canadian football player

See also 
Michálek